Major General Wilfrid Lewis Lloyd CBE, DSO and Bar, MC (1 March 1896 – 22 January 1944) was an officer in the British Army and the British Indian Army during the First and Second world wars.

Early life
Lloyd was born in York, England, on 1 March 1896, son of Major Ernest Thomas Lloyd (1860-1935), formerly of the Bengal Civil Service, and his wife Ethel Mary (died 1961), second daughter of Sir Richard Dansey Green-Price, 2nd Baronet. Sir Guy Lloyd, 1st Baronet (1890-1987), another future British Army officer and Member of Parliament, was his elder brother.

First World War
Lloyd was commissioned into the 7th (Service) Battalion of the King's Shropshire Light Infantry in September 1914, arrived in France in October 1915, and fought with the regiment until 1917, winning a Military Cross during the Battle of the Somme. In 1917 he transferred to the Indian Army and was attached to 4th / 39th Garwhal Rifles. He was later to join the 19th Hyderabad Regiment.

He remained in the army during the interwar period, attending the Staff College, Camberley from 1927−1928.

Second World War
In July 1940, Brigadier Lloyd was appointed to the 5th Indian Infantry Brigade of the 4th Indian Infantry Division and commanded them in the Western Desert Campaign, the East African Campaign and the Syria-Lebanon campaign.  In the Western Desert, Lloyd's forces were involved in the opening stages of Operation Compass.  In East Africa, forces under Lloyd's command were involved in the Battle of Agordat and the Battle of Keren. In Syria, he commanded for a period Gentforce.  This was a combined British, Indian, and Free French force attacking towards Damascus. He was awarded the DSO on 8 July 1941, followed by a Bar to the award on 28 August. For his services in the latter campaigns he was mentioned in despatches on 30 December 1941.

From October 1941 to March 1943, during the Burma Campaign, Major-General Lloyd commanded the 14th Indian Infantry Division. The Division was defeated during the First Arakan Offensive and Lloyd was removed from command. Most of his contemporaries nevertheless considered he was not responsible for the defeat.

From July 1943, in succession to William Slim, to January 1944 Major-General Lloyd commanded the 10th Indian Infantry Division in Persia and later in the Italian Campaign. He was killed in an air crash in January 1944, aged 47, and was buried at Heliopolis War Cemetery, Cairo.

Personal life
Lloyd married in 1922 Phyllis Janet, younger daughter of John M.B. Turner, a solicitor, of Bournemouth, England.  The couple had two sons and two daughters, one of each survived them:

Peter John Ernest, born 1923.
Maureen Joan, born 1927, died 1943.
David Owen Reginald, born 1931, died 1934.
Patricia Jane, born 1938.

After his death, his widow remarried, to Francis Arnold Benedict Jones.

Command history
 General Staff Officer, Division - 1939
 CO 5th Indian Infantry Brigade, North Africa - 1940
 CO 5th Indian Infantry Brigade, East Africa - (1940–1941)
 CO 5th Indian Infantry Brigade, North Africa and Syria - 1941
 Director of Military Training, India - (1941–1942)
 GOC 14th Indian Infantry Division - (1941–1943)
 GOC 10th Indian Infantry Division - (1943–1944)

References

Bibliography

External links
 British Military History - Major General Wilfrid Lewis LLOYD
Generals of World War II
CWGC entry

|-

1896 births
1944 deaths
British Indian Army generals
King's Shropshire Light Infantry officers
British Army personnel of World War I
Indian Army personnel of World War I
Indian Army generals of World War II
Indian Army personnel killed in World War II
Commanders of the Order of the British Empire
Companions of the Distinguished Service Order
Recipients of the Military Cross
Graduates of the Staff College, Camberley
Alumni of Trinity College Dublin
People educated at Shrewsbury School
Military personnel from York
Burials at Heliopolis War Cemetery